The 17th Canadian Film Awards were held on May 15, 1965 to honour achievements in Canadian film. The ceremony was hosted by Max Ferguson.

Winners

Films
Film of the Year: Not awarded
Feature Film: The Luck of Ginger Coffey — Crawley Films, Roth-Kershner Productions, Leon Roth producer, Irvin Kershner director
Arts and Experimental: Canon — National Film Board of Canada, Norman McLaren and Grant Munro directors
Le Monde va nous prendre pour des sauvages (People Might Laugh at Us) — National Film Board of Canada, Jacques Godbout and Françoise Bujold directors
TV Information: Summer in Mississippi — Canadian Broadcasting Corporation, Beryl Fox producer and director
TV Entertainment: The Open Grave — Canadian Broadcasting Corporation, Ron Kelly producer and director
Films for Children: Québec 1603 - Samuel de Champlain — National Film Board of Canada, Fernand Dansereau and André Belleau producers, Denys Arcand director
Travel and Recreation: Upper Canada Village — Moreland-Latchford Productions
Valley of the Swans — Photographic Branch, Government of British Columbia, Bernard H. Atkins director
General Information: Caroline — National Film Board of Canada, Georges Dufaux and Clément Perron directors
Some Are Sunfishers - Chetwynd Films, Arthur Chetwynd producer
Public Relations: Something Personal — Master Films
Sales Promotion: A Solid Investment — Williams, Drege & Hill
Training and Instruction: The Perception of Orientation — National Film Board of Canada, Sidney Goldsmith producer, Grahame Parker and Jacques Parent directors
Filmed Commercial, Company or Product: Rose Brand Pickles, Obsession — Robert Lawrence Productions
Filmed Commercial, Public Service: Money Burned — National Film Board of Canada, Grant McLean director
Amateur: Portrait of Lydia — John Straiton director
Certificate of Merit: Kente — Gordon Rose director
Certificate of Merit: Restless Journey — Hugh Greig producer and director
Certificate of Merit: The World Is Our Classroom — Helen Webb-Smith and Doris Kerr directors

Non-Feature Craft Awards
Black and White Cinematography: Jean-Claude Labrecque, Mémoire en fête (Walls of Memory) (NFB)
Colour Cinematography: Francis Chapman and Christopher Chapman, Expedition BluenoseSpecial AwardSweet Substitute (aka Caressed''), Larry Kent producer and director  — "for the very great promise and already substantial accomplishment clearly shown by director and actors alike, and for the sensitive and imaginative handling of the story".

References

Canadian
Canadian Film Awards (1949–1978)
1965 in Canada